Hazuregyra watanabei is a species of sea snail, a marine gastropod mollusk in the family Solariellidae.

Description
The shell grows to a length of 6 mm.

Distribution
This marine shell occurs off Japan.

References

 Higo, S., Callomon, P. & Goto, Y. (1999). Catalogue and bibliography of the marine shell-bearing Mollusca of Japan. Osaka: Elle Scientific Publications. 749 pp.

External links
 To World Register of Marine Species

Solariellidae
Gastropods described in 1962